Seoul Metropolitan Subway Line 3 (dubbed The Orange Line) of the Seoul Metropolitan Subway is a rapid transit service that connects Eunpyeong District to Gangnam and southeastern Seoul. Most trains head further northwest to serve Goyang via the Ilsan Line. In 2021, the Seoul Metro operated section had an annual ridership of 295,930,000 or 810,767 passengers per day.

In December 2010 the line is recorded as having the second highest WiFi data consumption in the Seoul Metropolitan area. It averaged 1.8 times more than the other 14 subway lines fitted with WiFi service zones.

History 
Construction began in 1980, and the first section of Line 3 opened (Gupabal–Yangjae; Jichuk opened in 1990) after the completion of work in two stages during 1985, along with subway Line 4. In October 1993, a second extension to the south was opened (Yangjae–Suseo).

In March 1996, the Korail Ilsan Line opened and allowed Line 3 trains to through operate all the way to the city of Goyang. There are 2 depots near Jichuk station and Suseo station, which are for both Korail and Seoul Metro.

A 3 km extension opened on February 18, 2010, stretching from Suseo to Garak Market (Line 8) and Ogeum (Line 5).

On December 27, 2014, Wonheung station opened between Wondang and Samsong stations.

Tourism 
In January 2013, the Seoul Metropolitan Rapid Transit Corporation, published free guidebooks in three languages: English, Japanese and Chinese (simplified and traditional), which features eight tours as well as recommendations for accommodations, restaurants and shopping centers. The tours are designed with different themes for travel along the subway lines, e.g. Korean traditional culture. Which goes from Jongno 3-ga station to Anguk station and Gyeongbokgung station on this line that showcases antique shops and art galleries of Insa-dong.

Stations

Rolling stock

Current 
 Seoul Metro 3000 series
 Chopper-controlled from GEC electric car – since 1989
 Chopper-controlled from GEC electric car (rebuilt cars) – since 2010
 VVVF inverter-controlled electric car
 First generation – since 2009
 Second generation – since 2022
 Korail Class 3000
 First generation – since 1995
 Second generation – since 2022
 Not yet in service.

See also 
 Subways in South Korea
 Seoul Metropolitan Subway

References

External links 

 Seoul Metropolitan Government's Line 3 extension page  includes a route map and status information for the extension from Suseo to Garak Market.
 UrbanRail.Net's Seoul Subway Page
 Map, station and route finder

 
Seoul Metropolitan Subway lines
Railway lines opened in 1985